Dongsheng Subdistrict is a subdistrict of central Nancha District, Yichun, Heilongjiang, China about 75 kilometres (47 miles) southwest of the city proper of Yichun. , it has 6 residential communities under its administration.

See also 
 List of township-level divisions of Heilongjiang

References 

Township-level divisions of Heilongjiang